Albert Ramchand Ramdin (born 27 February 1958) is a Surinamese diplomat serving as Minister of Foreign Affairs in the Santokhi cabinet since 16 July 2020. He is a member of the Progressive Reform Party (VHP).

Early life and education 
Ramdin was born in Suriname District and went to secondary school in Paramaribo. After completing secondary school, he left for the Netherlands where he studied social geography at the University of Amsterdam and the Vrije Universiteit Amsterdam.

Career 

In 1991, Ramdin became the Director of the HIMOS Development Agency in Oegstgeest, Netherlands. In 1997, Ramdin was appointed as the Permanent Representative of the Organization of American States (OAS) for Suriname.

In 1999, he became assistant general for external relations at the Caribbean Community (CARICOM). In 2001, Ramdin became adviser to the Secretary General of the OAS. On 7 June 2005, Radmin was elected Assistant Secretary General of the Organization of American States, and took office on 19 July 2005.

In July 2015, he returned to Suriname where he worked for the Ministry of Foreign Affairs. In May 2016, Ramdin started working for the American gold mining company Newmont Corporation.

Minister of Foreign Affairs 
On 16 July 2020, Ramdin became Minister of Foreign Affairs, International Business and International Cooperation in the cabinet of Santokhi. In August 2020, he was the first Surinamese member of government in ten years to pay an official visit to the Netherlands.

References 

1958 births
Ambassadors of Suriname
Foreign ministers of Suriname
Living people
Progressive Reform Party (Suriname) politicians
University of Amsterdam alumni
Vrije Universiteit Amsterdam alumni